, in English Matasaburo of the Wind, is a 1940 Japanese fantasy family drama film directed by Koji Shima, based on Kenji Miyazawa's 1934 short story of the same name.

Plot 
Saburō Takada transfers from a city to a very small school. The village children suspect that Saburō is actually Matasaburō, the wind sprite.

Cast 
 Akihiko Katayama as Saburo Takada
 Akira Oizumi as Ichiro (Koichi)
 Akiko Kazami
 Ryūji Kita
 Hiroshi Hayashi as Grandfather of Ichiro
 Bontaro Miake

See also 
Kenji Miyazawa
  – short story by Kenji Miyazawa

References

External links 
 

1940s Japanese films
Nikkatsu films
Films based on Japanese novels
1940 films
Japanese black-and-white films
1940s Japanese-language films
Films based on short fiction
Films based on works by Kenji Miyazawa
Japanese fantasy drama films
1940s fantasy drama films
1940 drama films